Columbia Lane – the Last Sessions is an album released by Australian country music singer Slim Dusty, who was recording the album when he died on 19 September 2003. The album was released on 1 March 2004.

At the ARIA Music Awards of 2004, the album was nominated for Best Country Album.

Track listing

Charts
Columbia Lane - the Last Sessions debuted at number 5 in the Australian album charts and number one on the country charts for the week commencing 8 March 2004. The album was certified gold within two weeks of release.

Weekly charts

Year-end charts

Certifications

Release history

Personnel
 Rod Coe – bass guitar except "Long Distance Driving", "Answer To Billy" and "Blue Hills (In The Distance)"
 Slim Dusty – acoustic guitar, vocals
 Michael Kerin – fiddle, acoustic guitar
 Anne Kirkpatrick – bass guitar on "Blue Hills (In The Distance)" and "Answer To Billy"
 Jeff Mercer – electric guitar, baritone guitar, resonator guitar, harmony vocals
 Lawrie Minson – harmonica
 Michel Rose – pedal steel guitar
 Rob Souther – drums
 Ian Simpson – banjo, acoustic guitar on "Answer To Billy"
 Michael Vidale – bass guitar on "Get Along"
 Tim Wedde – piano, accordion
 Steve Woods – upright bass on "Long Distance Driving"

References

External links
 Slim Dusty home page

Slim Dusty albums
2004 albums
EMI Records albums